Cycloparc PPJ is a rail trail located in the Pontiac Regional County Municipality in Quebec, Canada.

The PPJ traverses  of hills and riverfront and enables hikers and cyclists to tour through points of interest such as Grand Calumet Island, the Vinton Plain and Coulonge Chutes near Fort-Coulonge.  Slopes on the trail do not exceed 4%. The surface of the trail is made from a combination of stone and dust. No motor vehicles or hunting is permitted on the PPJ.

The trail is ideally suited for hikers and cyclists during the summer between May and October.  There are numerous places to swim along the trail, including the Ottawa River and nearby off-trail Fort William. There are 14 rest areas along the route.

The trail originates at Kilometre 0 in Wyman and ends at Allumette Island (L'Îles-aux-Allumettes).  Many rest areas, picnic spots and observation points are found along the length of the PPJ.  The trail crosses the Félix-Gabriel-Marchand Bridge, the second longest operational covered bridge in Canada.

The trail is named after the Pontiac Pacific Junction Railway (PPJ) because it occupies the rail bed of this defunct railway company.

Wildlife and nature
The trail is populated with numerous animals and those travelling along the route will find deer, bear, beaver and moose commonplace.  Motor vehicles are not permitted anywhere along the trail, providing a serene setting to spot local wildlife.  Different fruits available for picking along the PPJ include blueberries, wild apples and raspberries.

Trail highlights

  of pastoral bicycle ride,
  of wetlands and valleys sceneries,
  of meadows and forests,
  along the Ottawa River shores,
  on Allumette Island

See also
 Adventure travel
 Hiking
 Mountain biking
 Tourism in Canada

References

External links
 Cycloparc PPJ official website (English)

 

Transport in Outaouais
Rail trails in Quebec
Protected areas of Outaouais